Assyrian music may refer to:
Music of Mesopotamia, is a music in ancient Assyria
Assyrian folk/pop music
Syriac sacral music, sacral music in Syriac Christianity

See also
Syriac music (disambiguation)